X.1205 is a technical standard, that provides an overview of cybersecurity, it was developed by the Standardization Sector of the International Telecommunication Union (ITU-T). The standard provides an overview of cybersecurity as well as a taxonomy of threats in cybersecurity.

References 

ITU-T recommendations
ITU-T X Series Recommendations